James E. McLean is the previous Dean of the University of Alabama College of Education.

Prior to his position at University of Alabama he was a professor at East Tennessee State University.  He received his bachelor's degree, Master's degree, and Doctorate all from the University of Florida.

References

University of Florida alumni
Living people
University of Alabama faculty
East Tennessee State University faculty
Year of birth missing (living people)